Harvest Moon: Hero of Leaf Valley, known in Japan as , is a video game in the farm simulation series Harvest Moon for PlayStation Portable, developed by Marvelous Interactive Inc. and published in the U.S. by Natsume. It was released on March 19, 2009 in Japan and on April 26, 2010 in North America.

The game follows along the same lines as the rest of the Story of Seasons series, in which the player takes on the role of a farmer whose only goal in the game is to make a profit from the farm he runs including producing crops and raising livestock. The game is an enhanced remake of Harvest Moon: Save the Homeland, with many major changes.

Story

The player travels to Leaf Valley/Sugar Village to pick up his grandfather's things after hearing that he has died. He learns that the village will be turned into an amusement park, and encounters three "Harvest sprites" and the Harvest Goddess, who ask him to stay on the farm and help them. The player then decides to take over his grandfather's farm and work hard to turn the village around. By choosing different paths, you can find up to 16 ways to save the village.

Reception

The game received above-average reviews according to the review aggregation website Metacritic. IGN said "the controls can be frustrating at times" but that "I had a hard time putting down Harvest Moon: Hero of Leaf Valley." In Japan, Famitsu gave it a score of one six and three sevens for a total of 27 out of 40.

References

External links
 

2009 video games
Hero of Leaf Valley
Marvelous Entertainment
Real-time strategy video games
PlayStation Portable games
PlayStation Portable-only games
Video games developed in Japan
Rising Star Games games
Single-player video games
Natsume (company) games